The Song of Songs is a 1933 American pre-Code romantic drama film directed by Rouben Mamoulian, starring Marlene Dietrich as a naive German peasant named Lily who moves to Berlin and suffers a considerable amount of heartache. This particular version of the film was based on the 1908 novel The Song of Songs (Das hohe Lied) by Hermann Sudermann. The novel's original title, which translates to English as "The High Song", does indeed refer to the Song of Solomon, which is often described in German as "Das Hohe Lied der Liebe". However, that is not the only possible inference. "HoheLied" has been translated as "ode" "hosannas" "praises" and used in purely secular as well as religious contexts. Most telling in this case is the use in German of the entire phrase to describe the "great song of love" or "ode to love" in Paul's First Epistle to the Corinthians. This creates a double layer of meaning to the title of the novel in German, one that could not be duplicated in an English rendition.

The 1914 play, The Song of Songs by Edward Sheldon, also contributed to this version. It is a remake of the 1918 silent film The Song of Songs starring Elsie Ferguson and the 1924 silent film Lily of the Dust with Pola Negri.

Plot
Once in Berlin, Lily meets and poses for Richard, the sculptor who lives across the street. Despite the eventual romance between the two lovers, Lily marries one of Richard's wealthy clients, Baron von Merzbach.  By the end of the story, Lily and Richard are reunited after Lily struggles on a personal journey.

Cast
 Marlene Dietrich as Lily Czepanek
 Brian Aherne as Richard Waldow
 Lionel Atwill as Baron von Merzbach
 Alison Skipworth as Mrs. Rasmussen
 Hardie Albright as Walter Von Prell
 Helen Freeman as Fräulein Von Schwertfege
 Paul Panzer as carriage driver

Reviews and criticism 
The Encyclopædia Britannica notes that the film was "dismissed by a number of critics as 'a trite melodrama'.  However, it is difficult to either verify the proportion of negative to positive reviews or to substantiate the disdain the professional critic community might have held for the film due to lack of preservation of the actual reviews.

Box office
The film was a box office disappointment for Paramount.

References

External links

 
 
 

1933 films
1933 romantic drama films
1930s American films
1930s English-language films
American black-and-white films
American films based on plays
American romantic drama films
Films about sculptors
Films directed by Rouben Mamoulian
Films based on German novels
Films based on multiple works
Films based on works by Edward Sheldon
Films based on works by Hermann Sudermann
Films scored by Karl Hajos
Films scored by Bernhard Kaun
Films set in the 1900s
Films set in Berlin
Paramount Pictures films
Sound film remakes of silent films